Moritz Rothländer (born 10 November 1997) is a German field hockey player.

Career

Club level
In club competition, Rothländer plays for TSV Mannheim in the German Bundesliga.

Junior national team
Moritz Rothländer made his debut for the German U–21 team in 2016. His first appearance was during a test series against England in Bisham.

In 2017, he won a bronze medal with the junior team at the EuroHockey Junior Championship in Valencia.

Die Honamas
Rothländer made his debut for Die Honamas in 2016, winning bronze at the FIH Champions Trophy in London.

In 2019, following a string of appearances in test matches, Rothländer gained a more permanent role in the national squad and went on to compete in the first season of the FIH Pro League.

Following the retirements of senior players following the 2020 Summer Olympics, Rothländer was officially added to the national squad.

References

External links
 
 

1997 births
Living people
German male field hockey players
Male field hockey midfielders
Men's Feldhockey Bundesliga players
21st-century German people